The 1992 Toulon Tournament was the 20th edition of the Toulon Tournament and began on 24 May and ended on 2 June 1992. England were the defending champions.

Participant teams

 FR Yugoslavia

Venues
The matches were played in these communes:

Arles
Aubagne
Bormes-les-Mimosas
Brignoles	
Fréjus
La Ciotat
La Seyne-sur-Mer
Miramas
Nice
Six-Fours-les-Plages
Saint-Cyr
Sainte-Maxime
Toulon
Vitrolles

Squads

Results

Group A

Group B

All times local (CEST)

Knockout stage

Semifinals

Final

Goal scorers
4 goals
 Rui Costa
3 goals
 Pineda
 Snow
2 goals
 Toni
 João O. Pinto
 Petkovic
1 goal

 Lerch
 Neumann
 Rusnak
 Allen
 Kitson
 Dugarry 
 Meilhac
 Rabesandratana
 Thuram
 Ziani
 Castaneda
 Rangel
 Capucho
 Gil
 Hélder Cristóvão
 Brose
 Reyna
 Becanovic
 Vuksanovic

External links
Toulon Tournament

 
1992
1991–92 in French football
1992 in youth association football